Alexis Rhodes may refer to:

 Alexis Rhodes, known as Asuka Tenjouin in Japan, a character in Yu-Gi-Oh! GX
 Alex Rhodes (cyclist) (born 1984), Australian cyclist

See also
 Alex Rhodes (disambiguation)